The black-headed antbird (Percnostola rufifrons) is a species of passerine bird in the antbird family Thamnophilidae. It is found in Brazil, Colombia, French Guiana, Guyana, Peru, Suriname, and Venezuela. Its natural habitat is subtropical or tropical moist lowland forests.

Taxonomy
The black-headed antbird was formally described in 1789 by the German naturalist Johann Friedrich Gmelin in his revised and expanded edition of Carl Linnaeus's Systema Naturae. He placed it with the thrushes in the genus Turdus and coined the binomial name Turdus rufifrons. The specific epithet rufifrons combines the Latin rufus meaning "red" or "rufous" with frons meaning "forehead" or "front". Gmelin based his description on "Le merle roux de Cayenne" that had been described and illustrated in 1775 by the French polymath, the Comte de Buffon in his book Histoire Naturelle des Oiseaux. The black-headed antbird is now placed together with the Allpahuayo antbird in the genus Percnostola that was introduced in 1860 by Jean Cabanis and Ferdinand Heine.

Four subspecies are recognised:
 P. r. rufifrons (Gmelin, JF, 1789) – the Guianas and northeast Brazil
 P. r. subcristata Hellmayr, 1908 – north Brazil
 P. r. minor Pelzeln, 1868 – east Colombia, southwest Venezuela and northwest Brazil
 P. r. jensoni Capparella & Rosenberg, GH & Cardiff, 1997 – northeast Peru

References

Percnostola
Birds of the Guianas
Birds of the Venezuelan Amazon
Birds described in 1789
Taxa named by Johann Friedrich Gmelin
Taxonomy articles created by Polbot